PHP Development Tools (PDT) is a language IDE plugin for the Eclipse platform and the open-source project that develops it.

The project intends to encompass all tools necessary to develop PHP based software. It uses the existing Eclipse Web Tools Project to provide developers with PHP capabilities. All these PHP tools are easy to use and developers can speed up the development process by using these tools. Additional plugins are available as PDT Extensions.

Key features

PHP editor 

 Syntax Highlighting
 Content Assist
 Code Formatter
 Refactoring
 Code Templates

Easy and powerful code navigation

Debugging and profiling 

 Zend Debugger
 Xdebug

Syntax validation

Primary modules
Core — parser, search algorithm, communication and more
Debug — protocols, messages, executable and web server
User Interface — editor, views, preferences and wizards
Formatter — advanced code formatter
Refactoring — PHP refactoring support
PHPUnit — PHPUnit Support
Composer — Composer Support
Profiler — Xdebug and Zend Debugger profiling support

Project timeline
The project officially began around March 8, 2006. By the end of 2006, the project was approaching the 0.7 release. On April 6, 2007, 0.7 RC3 was released as the final 0.7 version.

In the latter half of 2007, a series of 1.0 milestones were reached, and on September 18, 2007, PDT 1.0 Final was released.

Naming issues
The PHP Development Tools project has had two names during its development. It was initially named PHP Development Tools, then changed to PHP IDE, and reverted to PHP Development Tools on January 1, 2007. Various documentation and reviews use either name.

Zend Technologies contributions
Significant PDT development is being done by  Zend Technologies. Zend sells a competing product named Zend Studio. PDT, as free software, may cannibalize sales of Zend Studio although the latter has more features. Others contend that PDT is deliberately maintained as a "lite" version of Zend Studio.

References

External links

PHP Development Tools project page

Eclipse (software)